John Berkeley, 5th Baron Berkeley of Stratton  (16 May 1697 – 18 April 1773), styled The Honourable John Berkeley until 1741, was a British politician, the last of the Bruton branch of the Berkeley family.

Background and education
Berkeley was the son of William Berkeley, 4th Baron Berkeley of Stratton, by Frances, daughter of Sir John Temple, Speaker of the Irish House of Commons. He was educated at Christ Church, Oxford.

Political career
Berkeley was returned to parliament as one of two representatives for Stockbridge in 1735, a seat he held until 1741, when he succeeded his father in the barony and took his seat in the House of Lords. In 1743 he was appointed Captain of the Yeomen of the Guard, which he remained until 1746. He was sworn of the Privy Council in 1752 and served as Treasurer of the Household between 1755 and 1756 and Captain of the Honourable Corps of Gentlemen Pensioners between 1756 and 1762. From 1762 to 1770 he was Lord-Lieutenant of the Tower Hamlets and Constable of the Tower of London.

Personal life
Lord Berkeley of Stratton was married but had no children. He died at a family home, Bruton Abbey, Somerset, in April 1773, aged 75, when the barony became extinct. He devised his grand estates which included Berkeley Square in London, to his kinsman the Frederick Augustus Berkeley, 5th Earl of Berkeley, his own branch descended in the male line from a Baron Berkeley who died in 1326, with some later shared female ancestry.

References

1697 births
1773 deaths
Alumni of Christ Church, Oxford
Berkeley, John
Lord-Lieutenants of the Tower Hamlets
Constables of the Tower of London
Berkeley, John
Members of the Privy Council of Great Britain
Treasurers of the Household
John
5